Per Jonas David Ljung (born 27 September 1975) is a Swedish former footballer who played as a defender.

Career
David Ljung signed for Molde FK in August 2001. In Molde, Ljung played 80 games before his transfer to Helsingborg in June 2004.

23 January 2006, Ljung left Helsingborg to play for Serie C team Padova.

Honours
AIK
Allsvenskan (1): 1998
Svenska Cupen (1): 1998-99

References

External links

Living people
1975 births
People from Skellefteå Municipality
Swedish footballers
Skellefteå AIK players
IK Sirius Fotboll players
AIK Fotboll players
Molde FK players
Allsvenskan players
Eliteserien players
Serie C players
Helsingborgs IF players
Swedish expatriate footballers
Expatriate footballers in Norway
Swedish expatriate sportspeople in Norway
Calcio Padova players
Expatriate footballers in Italy
Swedish expatriate sportspeople in Italy
Association football defenders
Sportspeople from Västerbotten County